South Branch Township may refer to:

 South Branch Township, Crawford County, Michigan
 South Branch Township, Wexford County, Michigan

See also 
 South Branch, Michigan, an unincorporated community in Goodar Township, Ogemaw County, Michigan
 South Branch Township (disambiguation)

Michigan township disambiguation pages